This article is about the particular significance of the year 1705 to Wales and its people.

Incumbents
Lord Lieutenant of North Wales (Lord Lieutenant of Anglesey, Caernarvonshire, Denbighshire, Flintshire, Merionethshire, Montgomeryshire) – Hugh Cholmondeley, 1st Earl of Cholmondeley
Lord Lieutenant of South Wales (Lord Lieutenant of Glamorgan, Brecknockshire, Cardiganshire, Carmarthenshire, Monmouthshire, Pembrokeshire, Radnorshire) – Thomas Herbert, 8th Earl of Pembroke

Bishop of Bangor –  John Evans
Bishop of Llandaff – William Beaw
Bishop of St Asaph – William Beveridge
Bishop of St Davids – George Bull (consecrated 29 April)

Events
29 April - George Bull is consecrated Bishop of St David's.
May–June - In the 1705 English general election, Richard Bulkeley, 4th Viscount Bulkeley, becomes MP for Anglesey, and Sir Thomas Powell, 1st Baronet, is MP for Monmouth Boroughs.
date unknown - Edward Brereton is replaced as MP for Denbigh after having offended the local gentry.

Arts and literature

New books
Myles Davies - The Recantation of Mr. Pollett, a Roman priest
Thomas Edwardes - Diocesan Episcopacy proved from Holy Scripture
Letters of Orinda to Poliarchus (the letters of Katherine Philips (posthumously published)
Walter Morgan - The Parson's Jewel

Births
6 May - William Morris, botanist, one of the Morris brothers of Anglesey (d. 1763)
date unknown
David Evans, Canon of St Asaph  (d. 1788)
Dafydd Nicolas, poet (d. 1774)

Deaths
August - William Richards, author of Wallography, or the Britton described
date unknown - Lionel Wafer, explorer, 65

See also
1705 in Scotland

References

1700s in Wales
Years of the 18th century in Wales